Amar Chitra Katha (ACK Comics) is an Indian publisher of Indian comics and graphic novels. Most of its comics are based on religious legends and epics, historical figures and biographies, folktales and cultural stories. The company was founded in 1967 by Anant Pai and is headquartered in Mumbai.

Creation and influence
The comic series was started by Anant Pai in an attempt to teach Indian children about their cultural heritage. He was shocked that Indian students could answer questions on Greek and Roman mythology, but were ignorant of their own history, mythology and folklore. It so happened that a quiz contest aired on Doordarshan in February 1967, in which participants could easily answer questions pertaining to Greek mythology, but were unable to reply to the question "In the Ramayana, who was Rama's mother?".

After quitting Indrajal Comics, Anant Pai started Amar Chitra Katha (ACK) by buying the rights for 10 American fairy tales such as Red Riding Hood, Snow White and Seven Dwarfs, Jack and the Beanstalk and Pinocchio. The first Indian comic done and released in ACK was Krishna (serial number #11).

The above is an oft-told story of how ACK was founded beginning with 'Uncle Pai', in Mumbai in 1967. However, Outlook magazine
has this article about the genesis of this popular comic series: The idea and proposal for Amar Chitra Katha was made by a Bangalore book salesman called G.K. Ananthram which led to the first Amar Chitra Katha comics being produced in 1965—in Kannada, not English. "The English ACK titles begin from number eleven because the first ten were in Kannada," clarifies Ananthram. To Ananthram's satisfaction, the 1965 Kannada ACK venture was a great commercial success which led to Mirchandani in the head office in Mumbai pursuing the Amar Chitra Katha idea in English diligently. "They brought in Anant Pai" says Ananthram. "And he built a wonderful team and a great brand."
By the late 1970s, it was selling 5 million copies a year and had a peak circulation of about 700,000 a month. India Book House started to bring out at least one comic book a month by 1975, and sometimes as many as three. While Pai initially wrote the first few stories himself, he soon hired a core team of writers and editors, which included Subba Rao, Luis Fernandes and Kamala Chandrakant, who were responsible for the attempt at authenticity and balanced portrayal of history in comic books that became the hallmark of Amar Chitra Katha. Writers like Margie Sastry, Debrani Mitra and C.R Sharma also joined the creative team of Amar Chitra Katha, with Anant Pai taking on the role of editor and co-writer on most scripts. The notable illustrators were Ram Waeerkar, who illustrated the very first issue of Amar Chitra Katha, Krishna, Dilip Kadam, C. M. Vitankar, Sanjeev Waeerkar, Souren Roy, C.D Rane, Ashok Dongre, V.B. Halbe, Jeffrey Fowler, Pratap Mullick and Yusuf Lien aka Yusuf Bangalorewala.

Criticism 
American scholar Jeremy Stoll has noted that, "As the earliest indigenous comic books in India, the Amar Chitra Katha series set a strong precedent, one which has dictated comics content and style for decades since". On the other hand, he noted the series' promotion of "nationalism", and lamented that "as the most widely published and read Indian comics, books from this series are the ones that most scholars [of Indian comics] have focused upon, to the detriment of understanding the wider context of India's comics, storytelling, and visual cultures".

The stories have often been in the past criticised as distorted depictions of history. Another criticism is that comic books, by their very nature, do not reflect the richness and complexity of the oral tradition of Indian mythology in which multiple versions of a story can co-exist simultaneously.

Response 
The producers and writers did not initially respond to the criticisms. Later, they argued that a historical story ought to be presented without any factual distortion. They also pointed out that they had published innumerable issues focusing on personal community, and that these depictions were every bit as flattering and respectful as issues on other personalities. The Muslim personalities thus eulogized in Amar Chitra Katha include Sakhi Sarwar (Syed Ahmad Sultan), Razia Sultana, Balban, Bahman Shah, Kabir, Babur, Humayun, Sher Shah Suri, Akbar, Tansen, Jehangir, Nur Jehan, Shah Jehan, Taj Mahal and Tipu Sultan among many others. Indeed, there is even an issue on the life and message of Jesus Christ, and this issue is twice the length of the normal issues. Nevertheless, in reaction to the left-wing criticism, the publishers commissioned a whole new series of issues honouring even more Muslim and Christian personalities, including Abdul Ghaffar Khan, ornithologist Salim Ali, Mother Teresa, Verghese Kurien, Jim Corbett and even rather obscure Muslim personalities like Thanedar Hasan Askari. They also included foreign personalities with no direct connection to India, such as Albert Einstein and Pierre & Marie Curie and an issue on the French Revolution.

The editors are now paying due effort in understanding different version of the mythological stories and accommodating them into regional versions too. The new editions have been released featuring regional folktales and local heroes reflecting regional diversity of the country. The editors have tried to pay close attention to the changing sensitivities of the people and trying to accommodate the diversity of story telling by giving equal importance to regional versions.

The portrayals of light-browns, dark-brown skinned heroes like Ram, Krishna are among the most prominent titles covered in Amar Chitra Katha. Also, dark skinned servants and subservient women have been swapped for a more neutral skin tone and women who are active influencers in the stories like Ahilyabai Holkar.

Films and television
The following films were produced by Amar Chitra Katha under ACK Animation Studios banner

See also 
 List of Amar Chitra Katha comics for a comprehensive listing of all titles released to date.

References

Further reading
 Love revives Indian comics After a break of 4 years, Amar Chitra Katha launches a new title on Mother Teresa: Little Acts of Love, on 26 August 2010, to celebrate the Mother's 100th birth anniversary.

External links
 
 

Comic book publishing companies of India
Indian comics titles
Publishing companies established in 1967
Indian comics
Comics adapted into animated films
Comics adapted into animated series